The 1979 Colgate-Palmolive Grand Prix was a professional tennis circuit held that year. It consisted of four Grand Slam tournaments, the Grand Prix tournaments and the Nations Cup, a team event.

Schedule 
The table below shows the 1979 Colgate-Palmolive Grand Prix schedule.

January

February

March

April

May

June

July

August

September

October

November

December

January 1980

Points system 
The tournaments were divided into twelve point categories. The highest points were allocated to the Grand Slam tournaments; French Open, the Wimbledon Championships, the US Open and the Australian Open. Points were allocated based on these categories and the finishing position of a player in a tournament. The points table is based on a 32 player draw. No points were awarded to first-round losers and advancements by default were equal to winning a round. The points allocation, with doubles points listed in brackets, was as follows:

Grand Prix standings 

1- John McEnroe (USA)

2. Björn Borg (Sue)

3. Jimmy Connors (USA)

4. Guillermo Vilas (Arg)

5. Vitas Gerulaitis (USA)

6. Roscoe Tanner (USA)

7. José Higueras (Spain)

8. Harold Solomon (USA)

9. Eddie Dibbs (USA)

10. Víctor Pecci (Par)

ATP rankings 

*The official ATP year-end rankings were listed from January 7th, 1980.

List of tournament winners 
The list of winners and number of singles titles won, alphabetically by last name:
  John Alexander (1) Louisville
  Victor Amaya (1) Surbiton
  Vijay Amritraj (1) Bombay
  Björn Borg (12) Richmond WCT, Boca Raton, Rotterdam, Monte Carlo, Las Vegas, French Open, Wimbledon, Båstad, Toronto, Palermo, Tokyo Indoor, WCT Challenge Cup
  José Luis Clerc (1) Johannesburg
  Jimmy Connors (7) Birmingham, Philadelphia, Memphis, Tulsa, Indianapolis, Stowe, Hong Kong
  Phil Dent (2) Brisbane, Sydney Outdoor
  Eddie Dibbs (1) Forest Hills WCT
  Peter Feigl (1) Cairo
  Wojciech Fibak (2) Denver, Stuttgart Indoor
  Peter Fleming (2) Cincinnati, Los Angeles
  Vitas Gerulaitis (3) Rome, Kitzbühel, Sydney Indoor
  Hans Gildemeister (2) Barcelona, Santiago
  Brian Gottfried (2) Columbus, Basel
  José Higueras (3) Houston, Hamburg, Boston
  Hans Kary (1) Lagos
  Johan Kriek (1) Sarasota
  Robert Lutz (1) Taiwan
  Gene Mayer (1) Cologne
  John McEnroe (10) New Orleans, Milan, San Jose, Dallas WCT, Queen's Club, South Orange, US Open, San Francisco, Stockholm, Wembley
  Peter McNamara (1) Berlin
  Bernard Mitton (1) Costa Rica
  Terry Moor (1) Tokyo Outdoor
  Yannick Noah (3) Nancy, Madrid, Bordeaux
  Tom Okker (1) Tel Aviv
  Manuel Orantes (1) Munich
  Andrew Pattison (1) Johannesburg
  Víctor Pecci (3) Nice, Quito, Bogotá
  Ulrich Pinner (1) Gstaad
  Raúl Ramírez (1) Florence
  Marty Riessen (1) Lafayette
  Bill Scanlon (1) Maui
  Tomáš Šmíd (1) Stuttgart Outdoor
  Stan Smith (2) Cleveland, Vienna
  Harold Solomon (3) Baltimore WCT, North Conway, Bercy
  Roscoe Tanner (2) Rancho Mirage, Washington Indoor
  Balázs Taróczy (2) Brussels, Hilversum
  Brian Teacher (1) Newport
  Guillermo Vilas (4) Hobart, Washington, D.C., Buenos Aires, Australian Open
  Butch Walts (2) Dayton, Bologna
  Kim Warwick (1) Adelaide
  Tim Wilkison (1) Auckland

The following players won their first title in 1979:
  Hans Gildemeister Barcelona
  Hans Kary Lagos
  Johan Kriek Sarasota
  Peter McNamara Berlin

See also 
 World Championship Tennis
 1979 WTA Tour

References

External links 
 ATP Archive: 1979 Colgate Palmolive Grand Prix tournaments.
 ATP – History Mens Professional Tours.

Further reading 
 

 
Grand Prix tennis circuit seasons
Grand Prix